The Brussels Black Angels are an American football team based in Brussels.The Black Angels are currently members of the Flemish American Football League (FAFL) conference in the Belgian Football League (BFL).

History
1987: Creation of the Waterloo All Stars
1989: Creation of the Brussels Angels American Football Club
1994: The Brussels Angels become an ASBL
2002: The Brussels Angels become the Brussels Black Angels

The American football team Brussels Angels actually originates in 1987 from the Waterloo All Stars because, at the time, they benefited from installations located in Waterloo. The team was founded by José Braga.

After a stay in Forest then in Uccle, where the team acquired its name of Brussels Angels, it finally settled in Woluwe Saint Lambert (better infrastructure, access and organisation, stadium of 9000 seats, etc.).

It is thus in 1989 that the Brussels Angels American Football Club was really created. At the time there were 17 players and the team participated in the Belgian championship organised by the Belgian Football League (BFL), itself founded in 1985 by a small group of Belgo-American amateurs.
Under the impulse of coach Shariar Broumand, the sixth year of competition in second division saw the team winning the title of Champion of second division which allowed it to participate in the first division championship (2nd Division).

During the 1994 season the team officially became an ASBL. In constant progression, the Brussels Angels will finally reach the championship's final in 1996 and will reiterate this achievement in 1997 and 1998 unfortunately without ever winning the much dreamed of title of Champion of Belgium. Being semi-finalist will nevertheless allow the Angels to participate in the European competitions in 1997 and 1998. The two following years (1999 and 2000) saw the best Belgian, Dutch and Luxembourg teams compete in a Benelux championship, where the Angels took part thanks to their high level of play. Twice the team will reach the semi-finals.

2001–2003
The new millennium saw the arrival of two new coaches, Tuck MacRae and Rob Lake, followed in 2001 by Karl Heineman and Blake Turvey. The year 2001 corresponded also to the creation of a new committee led by Alexis Forrest with the aim to boost the team and renew its players and the results would not be long to come with a title of Belgian Champions in 2003. This coincided with the arrival of two new coaches, Tom Munson and Morris Jablonka, replacing Blake Turvey and Rob Lake.

2001 Playoffs

2002 Playoffs

2004 season

2004 Playoffs

2005 season

2005 Playoffs

2006 season

2006 Playoffs

2007 season

2007 Playoffs

2008 season

2008 Playoffs

2009 season

2009 Playoffs

2010 season

 The game on week 3 was rescheduled due to a frozen underground of the gamefield.

2010 Playoffs

2011 season

2011 Playoffs

2012 season

2013 season

2013 Playoffs

2014 season

2014 Playoffs

2015 season

2015 Playoffs

Statistics

Performance (2000-2011)
This is an overview of the performance of the Black Angels against the teams in the FFL during the BFL regular and post seasons from 2000 until 2011.

Achievements
1994: Winner of Belgian Championship 2nd Division
1996: Vice-Champion of Belgium (Division 1)
1997: Vice-Champion of Belgium (Division 1)
1998: Vice-Champion of Belgium (Division 1)
1997: participation on the Eurocup
1998: participation on the Eurocup
1999: Participation in the Benelux Championship
2000: Participation in the Benelux Championship
2003: Winner of Belgian Championship
2004: Semi-finaliste of Belgian Championship
2005: Vice Champion of Belgium
2006: Semi-finaliste of Belgian Championship
2007: Vice Champion of Belgium
2008: Vice Champion of Belgium
2009: Semi-finaliste of Belgian Championship
2010: Semi-finaliste of Belgian Championship
2011: Vice-Champion of Belgium

References

External links
Official Black Angels website

American football teams in Belgium
1989 establishments in Belgium
American football teams established in 1989